Sir Thomas Felton, 4th Baronet (12 October 1649 – 3 March 1709), of Whitehall, Westminster and Playford, Suffolk, was an English courtier and Whig politician who sat in the House of Commons between 1690 and 1709 . 

Felton was the son of Sir Henry Felton, 2nd Baronet of Playford, Suffolk and his wife Susanna Tollemache, daughter of Sir Lionel Tollemache, 2nd Baronet, of Helmingham.

Felton was a Page of Honour from 1665 to 1671 and became Groom of the Bedchamber in March 1671. He was  appointed Master of the Hawks in 1675. By  1679 he had left the post as Groom to King Charles through unknown circumstances. He had married Lady Elizabeth Howard, one of the daughters and coheirs of James Howard, 3rd Earl of Suffolk but she died in 1681. On the accession of William and Mary in 1689, Felton became Master of the Household.

Felton was returned as Member of Parliament for Orford at the 1690 English general election.  He was returned for Orford unopposed at the 1695 English general election. In 1697, he succeeded his elder brother in the baronetcy. By 1698, he  had become unpopular. At the 1698 English general election he stood for Suffolk where he was heavily defeated and for Orford again where he was returned in a fierce contest. The result was disputed and he was unseated on petition on 10 February 1700. At the first general election of 1701 he was defeated at Orford, and at the second general election of 1701 he stood instead at Bury St Edmunds on the interest of his son-in-law John Hervey and was  returned as MP in a contest.  He was returned at Bury St Edmunds in a contest in 1702 and unopposed in 1705. At the 1708 British general election, he was returned again for Bury St Edmunds and was also promoted to Comptroller of the Household to Queen Anne. 

Felton died at his lodgings in Whitehall from gout in the stomach on 3 March 1709. He was buried six days later at St Mary's church Playford, where his gravestone lies in the chancel. His daughter  Elizabeth married John Hervey, 1st Earl of Bristol.

References

1649 births
1709 deaths
Baronets in the Baronetage of England
English MPs 1690–1695
English MPs 1701–1702
English MPs 1702–1705
Masters of the Household
Politicians from Bury St Edmunds